Ctenochilus is a small south Andean and Patagonian genus of potter wasps.

References

 Giordani Soika, A. 1964 (1962). Sul genere Ctenochilus Sauss. Boll. Mus. Civ. Stor. Nat. Venezia 15: 91–103.

Potter wasps